Katherine Olivia Haik (born May 9, 2000) is an American model and beauty pageant titleholder who was crowned Miss Teen USA 2015. At age 15, she was the youngest contestant to ever be crowned Miss Teen USA as well as the second entrant from Louisiana to win the title, following Shelley Hennig who won Miss Teen USA 2004.

Early life and education
Haik was born on May 9, 2000, in Covington, Louisiana to Tim and Jennifer Haik, yet was raised in Franklinton. She graduated from Franklinton High School in 2018, and attends Louisiana State University, where she is a member of Kappa Delta sorority. She graduated from LSU in May of 2022.

Pageantry
Haik competed in Miss Louisiana Teen USA 2015 and won the competition. She went on to compete at Miss Teen USA 2015, where was crowned the winner.

After the announcement that the Miss Teen USA competition would eliminate the swimsuit round in 2016, Haik publicly stated that she supported the decision to switch the component of the competition to athleisure, adding it was "a great way to celebrate the active lives that so many young women lead and set a strong example for our peers."

Personal life
Haik is a member of the First Baptist Church of Franklinton, Louisiana and has played softball since the age of 3.

References

Living people
2000 births
Miss Teen USA winners
People from Franklinton, Louisiana
People from Covington, Louisiana
American beauty pageant winners
Female models from Louisiana
Louisiana State University alumni
21st-century American women